Campti (YTB-816) was a United States Navy  named for Campti, Louisiana.

Construction

The contract for Campti was awarded 9 August 1971. She was laid down on 21 May 1972 at Marinette, Wisconsin, by Marinette Marine and launched 4 November 1972.

Operational history

Delivered to the navy 22 December 1972, Campti was assigned to the Naval Submarine Base New London, Connecticut.  Sometime between 1985 and 1990, she was reassigned to Naval Amphibious Base Little Creek Virginia, where she served the rest of her career until retirement.

Stricken from the Navy List 9 November 1999, ex-Campti was sold by Defense Reutilization and Marketing Service (DRMS) 27 September 2000 to Hartley Marine. She was renamed Seguin and served Hartley until at least 2007.

References

External links
 

 

Natick-class large harbor tugs
Ships built by Marinette Marine
1972 ships